Cale Simmons (born February 5, 1991) is an American track and field athlete who competes in the pole vault. He was runner-up at the USA Outdoor Track and Field Championships in 2016 and was chosen for the 2016 Rio Olympics.

This placed him in the top twenty American athletes for the year.

He dropped out of the sport for a couple of years but returned in better form in 2016. He made the national podium at the 2016 USA Indoor Track and Field Championships. A week before the trials, he set his personal record and qualifying mark for the Olympics at an obscure meet called the Kyle MacIntosh Twilight at Valor Christian High School in Highlands Ranch, Colorado, a meet primarily for high school and middle school aged athletes.  The pole vault was the only event open for open athletes and only 5 jumped.

He entered the 2016 United States Olympic Trials and jumped  to make his first American Olympic team.

References

External links

Living people
1991 births
People from Rocklin, California
Track and field athletes from California
American male pole vaulters
United States Air Force officers
Athletes (track and field) at the 2016 Summer Olympics
Olympic track and field athletes of the United States
United States Air Force World Class Athlete Program
United States Air Force Athlete of the Year
Military personnel from California